Kurotsuchi may refer to:

Berardius minimus, a smaller, darker beaked whale species, found in the northwest Pacific Ocean
Mayuri Kurotsuchi, a character who is Captain of the 12th Division and President of the Shinigami Research Institute in the Japanese Bleach series.    
Nemu Kurotsuchi, a  character who is artificially created daughter of the Captain in the Japanese Bleach series.    
Kurotsuchi, a character who is the granddaughter of the Third Tsuchikage, Onoki in the Japanese Naruto series.